Gorakhpur is a city in Uttar Pradesh India. 

Gorakhpur may also refer to:
 Administrative units centred on the city:
 Gorakhpur district
 Gorakhpur division
 Gorakhpur (Lok Sabha Constituency)
 Gorakhpur, Palghar, a village in Maharashtra, India
 Gorakhpur, Haryana, a village in Fatehabad district of Haryana